Colonel Francis William Bullock-Marsham  (13 July 1883 – 22 December 1971) was a senior officer in the British Army and an English amateur cricketer who played one first-class cricket match for Kent County Cricket Club and one for Marylebone Cricket Club (MCC), both in 1905. Part of the Marsham family that were involved with Kent County Cricket Club. He was born in Bicester and died in Maidstone.

Bullock-Marsham was educated at Eton College until 1901. Between 1932 and 1936 Bullock-Marsham commanded the 1st Cavalry Brigade with the temporary rank of Brigadier. He was an aide-de-camp to three British monarchs, George V, Edward VII and George VI from 1935 to 1938.

He married  on 19 April 1922 Finovola Marianne Eleanor Maclean ( 1887 – 1985), widow of Captain Roger Cordy-Simpson.

References

1883 births
1971 deaths
English cricketers
Marylebone Cricket Club cricketers
19th Royal Hussars officers
3rd Carabiniers officers
Companions of the Distinguished Service Order
Recipients of the Military Cross
People educated at Eton College
British Army personnel of World War I
Kent cricketers